Peter Somerville (born 8 July 1968) is a former Australian rules footballer who played 160 games for Essendon in the AFL.

A ruckman, and son of John Somerville, he shared rucking duties with Paul Salmon for much of his career. He was a premiership player with Essendon and represented Victoria in 1991 and was well known for his amazing high leaping marks.

After a successful career spanning over a decade, Somerville owned and operated his own plumbing business until 2002. He then ventured to the Sunshine Coast in Queensland to teach plumbing at TAFE.

Statistics

|- style="background-color: #EAEAEA"
! scope="row" style="text-align:center" | 1988
|
| 42 || 4 || 2 || 3 || 31 || 10 || 41 || 23 || 4 || 35 || 0.5 || 0.8 || 7.8 || 2.5 || 10.3 || 5.8 || 1.0 || 8.8 || 3
|- 
! scope="row" style="text-align:center" | 1989
|
| 19 || 3 || 2 || 2 || 24 || 11 || 35 || 15 || 3 || 16 || 0.7 || 0.7 || 8.0 || 3.7 || 11.7 || 5.0 || 1.0 || 5.3 || 0
|- style="background-color: #EAEAEA"
! scope="row" style="text-align:center" | 1990
|
| 19 || 4 || 5 || 1 || 21 || 12 || 33 || 15 || 4 || 16 || 1.3 || 0.3 || 5.3 || 3.0 || 8.3 || 3.8 || 1.0 || 4.0 || 0
|- 
! scope="row" style="text-align:center" | 1991
|
| 19 || 17 || 14 || 12 || 109 || 59 || 168 || 85 || 8 || 52 || 0.8 || 0.7 || 6.4 || 3.5 || 9.9 || 5.0 || 0.5 || 3.1 || 0
|- style="background-color: #EAEAEA"
! scope="row" style="text-align:center" | 1992
|
| 19 || 20 || 21 || 16 || 169 || 71 || 240 || 114 || 11 || 145 || 1.1 || 0.8 || 8.5 || 3.6 || 12.0 || 5.7 || 0.6 || 7.3 || 5
|- 
|style="text-align:center;background:#afe6ba;"|1993†
|
| 19 || 18 || 13 || 14 || 116 || 81 || 197 || 91 || 14 || 155 || 0.7 || 0.8 || 6.4 || 4.5 || 10.9 || 5.1 || 0.8 || 8.6 || 0
|- style="background-color: #EAEAEA"
! scope="row" style="text-align:center" | 1994
|
| 19 || 10 || 6 || 1 || 57 || 39 || 96 || 33 || 6 || 75 || 0.6 || 0.1 || 5.7 || 3.9 || 9.6 || 3.3 || 0.6 || 7.5 || 0
|- 
! scope="row" style="text-align:center" | 1995
|
| 19 || 24 || 18 || 7 || 177 || 140 || 317 || 128 || 17 || 319 || 0.8 || 0.3 || 7.4 || 5.8 || 13.2 || 5.3 || 0.7 || 13.3 || 12
|- style="background-color: #EAEAEA"
! scope="row" style="text-align:center" | 1996
|
| 19 || 21 || 5 || 5 || 110 || 100 || 210 || 73 || 10 || 289 || 0.2 || 0.2 || 5.2 || 4.8 || 10.0 || 3.5 || 0.5 || 13.8 || 3
|- 
! scope="row" style="text-align:center" | 1997
|
| 19 || 13 || 1 || 0 || 76 || 46 || 122 || 52 || 5 || 137 || 0.1 || 0.0 || 5.8 || 3.5 || 9.4 || 4.0 || 0.4 || 10.5 || 1
|- style="background-color: #EAEAEA"
! scope="row" style="text-align:center" | 1998
|
| 19 || 12 || 0 || 2 || 64 || 37 || 101 || 34 || 8 || 212 || 0.0 || 0.2 || 5.3 || 3.1 || 8.4 || 2.8 || 0.7 || 17.7 || 0
|- 
! scope="row" style="text-align:center" | 1999
|
| 19 || 14 || 2 || 0 || 65 || 44 || 109 || 37 || 10 || 239 || 0.1 || 0.0 || 4.6 || 3.1 || 7.8 || 2.6 || 0.7 || 17.1 || 0
|- class="sortbottom"
! colspan=3| Career
! 160
! 89
! 63
! 1019
! 650
! 1669
! 700
! 100
! 1690
! 0.6
! 0.4
! 6.4
! 4.1
! 10.4
! 4.4
! 0.6
! 10.6
! 24
|}

References

External links

1968 births
Living people
Australian rules footballers from Victoria (Australia)
Essendon Football Club players
Essendon Football Club Premiership players
North Ballarat Football Club players
Victorian State of Origin players
One-time VFL/AFL Premiership players